The 38th District of the Iowa House of Representatives in the state of Iowa.

Current elected officials
Garrett Gobble is the representative currently representing the district.

Past representatives
The district has previously been represented by:
 Charles J. Uban, 1971–1973
 Harold O. Fischer, 1973–1975
 T. Cooper Evans, 1975–1979
 Robert H. Renken, 1979–1983
 Arthur Ollie, 1983–1997
 Polly Bukta, 1997–2003
 Rob Hogg, 2003–2007
 Tyler Olson, 2007–2013
 Kevin Koester, 2013–2019
 Heather Matson, 2019–2021
 Garrett Gobble, 2021–present

References

038